Hüseyin Dündar (born 1986 in Adana, Turkey) is a Turkish martial artist competing in the boxing, kickboxing, Muay Thai and wushu disciplines. He is Turkey's first world gold medalist in Sanshou. He is a member of Fenerbahçe SK.

Hüseyin Dündar studied Physical Training and Sports at the Çukurova University in Adana. Currently, he is a teacher at a primary education school in Adana.

Achievements
Boxing
 (54 kg) 2006 World University Boxing Championship - October 2–9, 2006 Almaty, Kazakhstan
 (54 kg) 22nd International Ahmet Cömert Tournament - May 9–13, 2007 Istanbul, Turkey

Kickboxing
 (54 kg-Full contact) World IAKSA Championships - September 2005, Moscow, Russia
 (54 kg) National Championships - September 26-October 1, 2006 Malatya, Turkey
 (57 kg) National K-1/Low kick Championships - July 2–6, 2008 Mersin, Turkey
 (57 kg) National K-1/Low kick Championships - April 19–24, 2010 Antalya, Turkey
 (57 kg) National Championships (Full Contact) - May 2–7, 2011 Urfa, Turkey
 (57 kg) WAKO World Championships (Full Contact) -November 20–27, 2011 Dublin, Ireland
 (57 kg) National Championships (Full Contact) - March 5–10, 2012 Kirsehir, Turkey

Muay Thai
 (54 kg) National Championships - March 13–18, 2007, Hatay, Turkey
 (57 kg) National Championships - April 15–19, 2009, Antalya, Turkey

Wushu
 (52 kg) 9th European Championships - October 25–27, 2002, Póvoa de Varzim, Portugal
 (52 kg) 7th World Championships - November 3–7, 2003, Macau, China
 (52 kg) 10th European Championships - 2004, Moscow, Russia
 (52 kg) 11th European Championships - November 6–12, 2006, Lignano, Italy
 (52 kg) 9th World Championships - November 11–17, 2007, Beijing, China
 (52 kg) 4th World Cup - September 19–21, 2008, Harbin, China
 (52 kg) 12th European Championships - October 16–19, 2008, Warsaw, Poland
 (52 kg) 9th World Championships - October 25–29, 2009, Toronto, Canada
 (52 kg) 13th European Championships - March 6–13, 2010, Antalya, Turkey

References

1986 births
Living people
Sportspeople from Adana
Çukurova University alumni
Fenerbahçe boxers
Turkish sanshou practitioners
Bantamweight kickboxers
Turkish Muay Thai practitioners
Turkish male kickboxers
Turkish male boxers
European champions for Turkey
World Games silver medalists
Competitors at the 2013 World Games
World Games medalists in wushu
20th-century Turkish people
21st-century Turkish people